Drew Edward VerHagen (born October 22, 1990) is an American professional baseball pitcher for the St. Louis Cardinals of Major League Baseball (MLB). He previously played in MLB for the Detroit Tigers from 2014 to 2019. He also played for the Hokkaido Nippon-Ham Fighters of Nippon Professional Baseball (NPB) from 2020 to 2021.

Early life
VerHagen attended Rockwall-Heath High School in Heath, Texas, where he was a three-year letter winner. VerHagen did not pitch his senior year due to having Tommy John surgery on his right elbow.

College career
VerHagen began his collegiate career by enrolling at the University of Oklahoma in 2010, where he pitched  innings with a 3.38 earned run average (ERA) for the Oklahoma Sooners. He spent the summer with the Hyannis Harbor Hawks of the Cape Cod League, where he was 0–1 with a 1.66 ERA.

The following year he transferred to Navarro College, where he was a member of the 2011 National Junior College Athletic Association JUCO World Series championship team. VerHagen then transferred to Vanderbilt University, where he made 27 appearances, including seven starts, and went 6–3 with a 3.50 ERA in  innings for the Vanderbilt Commodores in 2012.

Professional career

Detroit Tigers
VerHagen was drafted in the fourth round, 154th overall, by the Detroit Tigers in the 2012 MLB Draft.

After signing with Detroit, VerHagen pitched in the Rookie-level Gulf Coast League for the Gulf Coast League Tigers and for the Lakeland Flying Tigers of the Class A-Advanced Florida State League. He went 0–3 with a 3.48 ERA in 10 games, including six starts in 2012. In 2013, he split his time between Lakeland and the Erie SeaWolves of the Class AA Eastern League. VerHagen went 7–8 with a 2.90 ERA and a 1.147 WHIP in 24 appearances.

In 2014, Tigers invited VerHagen to spring training. Prior to being called up in 2014, VerHagen was 6–7, with a 3.67 ERA and 63 strikeouts in 19 starts for the Triple-A Toledo Mud Hens. VerHagen made his major league debut for the Detroit Tigers on July 19, 2014, in a game against the Cleveland Indians. VerHagen allowed five hits and three earned runs in five innings, while walking three and striking out four. He was optioned back to Triple-A Toledo the next day.

In 2015, VerHagen was converted into a reliever, making 20 appearances out of the bullpen between AA Erie and AAA Toledo. He made one appearance with the Tigers on July 5, and was optioned back to Toledo. He returned to the Tigers for an August 19 appearance against the Chicago Cubs, and remained with the parent club the rest of the season. VerHagen recorded his first career major league win, in a 9–2 decision over the Cleveland Indians in the second game of a doubleheader on September 13, 2015. He pitched two scoreless innings, allowing zero hits and two walks. For the 2015 season, he would pitch a total of  innings with the Tigers, surrendering only 18 hits while striking out 13 and posting a 2.05 ERA.

In 2016, VerHagen made the Tigers' opening day roster. On May 22, 2016, he was optioned to AAA Toledo after compiling a 7.11 ERA in 19 innings pitched. A day later, the Tigers placed him on the 60-day disabled list due to right shoulder thoracic outlet syndrome.

In 2017, Tigers optioned VerHagen to AAA Toledo to start the 2017 season. He was recalled on July 24. He made 24 appearances (two starts) in the 2017 season, compiling a 5.77 ERA with 25 strikeouts in  innings.

In spring training 2018, manager Ron Gardenhire and VerHagen discussed a full-time bullpen role for the upcoming season. VerHagen made the Tigers opening day roster, and was placed in the bullpen. On April 23, he was designated for assignment after posting a 6.30 ERA in 10 innings. The Tigers announced that they would purchase VerHagen's contract so he could start the first game of a doubleheader on June 4, 2018. He posted a 4.27 ERA the rest of the season, contributing to a final line of 3–3, 4.63 ERA, and 53 strikeouts in  innings.

In 2019, VerHagen was designated for a rehab assignment in Class A Lakeland to start the 2019 season, due to a sore shoulder. He was recalled to the Tigers on April 7, following an injury to starter Matt Moore. The Tigers designated VerHagen for assignment on May 4 after he gave up six runs in a 15–3 loss. He was outrighted to Toledo on May 11. On July 25, the Tigers selected his contract. On August 23, VerHagen struck out a career-high 11 batters in a win over the Minnesota Twins. He finished the season with a record of 4–3 in 22 games (four starts), with a 5.90 ERA and 51 strikeouts in 58 innings pitched. VerHagen was released on November 25, 2019.

Hokkaido Nippon-Ham Fighters
On November 26, 2019, VerHagen signed a one-year contract with the Hokkaido Nippon-Ham Fighters of Nippon Professional Baseball (NPB). He signed a one-year extension with the team on November 22, 2020. He became a free agent following the 2021 season.

St. Louis Cardinals
On March 11, 2022, VerHagen agreed to a two-year contract worth $5.5 million with the St. Louis Cardinals.

Pitch selection
VerHagen throws two primary pitches: a fastball in the 93–96 mph range (topping out at ), and an upper-70s curveball. He throws his fastball as both a four-seamer and a two-seamer. He mixes in an occasional changeup at 82–86 mph.

References

External links

Vanderbilt Commodores bio

1990 births
Living people
American people of Dutch descent
Baseball players from Texas
Detroit Tigers players
Erie SeaWolves players
Gulf Coast Tigers players
Hokkaido Nippon-Ham Fighters players
Hyannis Harbor Hawks players
Lakeland Flying Tigers players
Major League Baseball pitchers
Nippon Professional Baseball pitchers
Oklahoma Sooners baseball players
People from Heath, Texas
People from Royse City, Texas
St. Louis Cardinals players
Toledo Mud Hens players
Vanderbilt Commodores baseball players